The GCR Class 5 (LNER Class J62) was a class of twelve  steam tank locomotives designed by Harry Pollitt (engineer) for work in docks operated by the Manchester, Sheffield and Lincolnshire Railway (MS&LR) later renamed Great Central Railway (GCR).

History
These locomotives were designed by Pollitt for working at Grimsby and other dock locations.  (No. 891 was the last engine to be built by the MS&LR, and No. 892 the first engine to be built by the GCR both in 1897.) They passed to the London and North Eastern Railway at the grouping in 1923 and received the LNER classification J62. Withdrawals began in 1935, but there were three examples surviving in 1948 which passed to British Railways ownership. The last example was withdrawn in 1951.

One example (No. 889) was rebuilt in 1903 as an  but reverted to its original form in 1918 after a collision.

Bibliography

External links
 The Pollitt J62 (GCR Class 5) 0-6-0ST Locomotives— LNER Encyclopedia

05
0-6-0ST locomotives
Railway locomotives introduced in 1897
Scrapped locomotives
Standard gauge steam locomotives of Great Britain

Shunting locomotives